Ursula Deinert (17 October 1910 – 21 December 1988) was a German dancer and film actress.

Selected filmography
 Woman's Love—Woman's Suffering (1937)
 Nanon (1938)
 Capriccio (1938)
 Robert and Bertram (1939)
  (1939)
 Woman at the Wheel (1939)
 My Aunt, Your Aunt (1939)
 The Rothschilds (1940)
 Jud Süß (1940)
 Sonntagskinder (1941)
 Pedro Will Hang (1941)

Bibliography
 O'Brien, Mary-Elizabeth. Nazi Cinema as Enchantment: The Politics of Entertainment in the Third Reich. Camden House, 2006.

External links

1910 births
1988 deaths
German film actresses
German female dancers
Actresses from Berlin
20th-century German actresses